John Van Ryn (June 30, 1905 – August 7, 1999) was an American tennis champion of the 1930s. He was primarily known as the doubles partner of Wilmer Allison.

Van Ryn won the Men's Doubles at Wimbledon three straight years (1929–31). He took two of the titles with Wilmer Allison and won the third with George Lott. In 1931, he was also successful with Lott at the French Championships. He became the first male player to win the French, British and American doubles titles when he won the 1931 U.S. National Championships with Allison. Van Ryn had an excellent record when he competed for the United States in Davis Cup, winning 22 of 24 encounters in a period of eight years. He was inducted into the Tennis Hall of Fame in 1963.

On 22 October 1930 he married tennis player Midge Gladman.

Grand Slam finals

Doubles (6 titles, 5 runners-up)

References

External links 
 
 
 
 

American male tennis players
American people of Dutch descent
French Championships (tennis) champions
Sportspeople from Newport News, Virginia
International Tennis Hall of Fame inductees
Tennis people from Virginia
United States National champions (tennis)
Wimbledon champions (pre-Open Era)
1905 births
1999 deaths
Grand Slam (tennis) champions in men's doubles
Princeton Tigers men's tennis players